The University of Connecticut School of Law (UConn Law) is the law school associated with the University of Connecticut and located in Hartford, Connecticut. It is the only public law school in Connecticut and one of only four in New England. In 2020 it enrolled 488 JD students.

Background 
Founded in 1921 as the Hartford College of Law, the law school is accredited by the American Bar Association, and is a member of the Association of American Law Schools.  In 1948 it affiliated with the University of Connecticut, now ranked among the top 25 public research universities nationally. The law school's Collegiate Gothic-style buildings were constructed in 1925, with the exception of the Thomas J. Meskill Law Library, which was completed in 1996. The campus housed the Hartford Seminary until 1981 and is listed on the National Register of Historic Places.

Academics 
In addition to the Juris Doctor (JD) degree, the law school offers several joint degrees, combining a Juris Doctor degree with a Master of Laws, Master of Business Administration, Master of Public Affairs Administration, Master of Public Health, or Master of Social Work. UConn Law offers LLM degrees in Energy and Environmental Law, Human Rights and Social Justice, U.S. Legal Studies and Insurance Law—the only LLM program in insurance law in the United States. UConn Law also offers the SJD (Doctor of the Science of Laws) degree and a professional certificate in corporate and regulatory compliance.

JD and LLM candidates may pursue certificates in Corporate and Regulatory Compliance, Energy and Environmental Law, Human Rights, Intellectual Property, and Tax Studies. JD candidates may also earn certificates in Insurance Law and Regulation, Law and Public Policy, and Transactional Practice. LLM candidates may also pursue a certificate in Financial Services or one of four Foundational Certificates in U.S. Law.

In addition, UConn Law offers 19 clinics and field placement programs that provide hands-on, practical training to upper-level students who earn up to 10 credits for their work. These clinics include Animal Law, Asylum and Human Rights, Energy and Environmental Law, Children's Advocacy, Criminal, Intellectual Property and Entrepreneurship Law, Mediation, U.S. Attorney's, and Tax clinics. Seminars in a multitude of different substantive areas are available to upper-level students for about 3 credits. Internships and field work are available to upper-level students. Research positions are open to upper-level students under the direction of a faculty adviser.

Library 

The  Thomas J. Meskill Law Library is one of the largest law libraries in the country and houses the most comprehensive collection of insurance materials in the country. The Law Library has access to hundreds of electronic databases, including Westlaw, Lexis and Bloomberg. It  has five classrooms, 12 group study rooms, an adaptive technology study room, a meditation room, a café, two student lounges, and 285 study carrels, with total seating for 964. The Law Library works closely with the University of Connecticut Libraries, which form the largest public research collection in the state of Connecticut. The main library is the Homer D. Babbidge Library at the Storrs campus.

Law journals and publications 
UConn Law students produce four scholarly journals: the Connecticut Law Review, the Connecticut Public Interest Law Journal, the Connecticut Insurance Law Journal, and the Connecticut Journal of International Law. 

The Connecticut Law Review is the oldest, largest, and most active student-run publication at the School of Law.

The Connecticut Public Interest Law Journal is a student-run biannual law review published by the school. It was established in 2001 and is abstracted and indexed in HeinOnline. Every fall, the journal hosts a symposium on issues related to public interest law.

The Connecticut Journal of International Law is a biannual student-edited law review covering international and comparative law. It has published by the school since 1985. The journal sponsors an annual symposium. It is abstracted and indexed in EBSCO and ProQuest databases as well as in HeinOnline.

The Connecticut Insurance Law Journal is a quarterly law review covering insurance law. It was established in 1994. The journal is abstracted and indexed in HeinOnline, EBSCO and ProQuest databases, the Index to Legal Periodicals & Books, and the Emerging Sources Citation Index.

Admission  
According to the University of Connecticut's official 2021 ABA-required Standard 509 Information Report, the university offered admission to 28.79 percent of JD applicants. For the 2021 first-year class, the University of Connecticut School of Law received 1,754 completed applications and offered admission to 505 applicants, of which 144 enrolled.

Employment 
UConn Law's two-year bar passage rate was 91.61 percent for the Class of 2017.

Ten months after graduation, 90.4 percent of the Class of 2019 was employed. University of Connecticut's Law School Transparency under-employment score is 11.3%, indicating the percentage of the Class of 2016 unemployed, pursuing an additional degree, or working in a non-professional, short-term, or part-time job nine months after graduation.

Faculty 

Thirteen members of the full-time faculty hold doctoral degrees. Notable faculty members include:

 Loftus Becker, Professor Emeritus
 Sara Bronin, Thomas F. Gallivan Chair in Real Property Law and Faculty Director, Center for Energy and Environmental Law
 Timothy Fisher, Dean Emeritus and Professor of Law
 James Kwak, Professor of Law
 Peter Lindseth, Olimpiad S. Ioffe Professor of International and Comparative Law
 Steven Wilf, Anthony J. Smits Professor of Global Commerce

Notable alumni 

Bethany J. Alvord, 1982, Judge of the Connecticut Appellate Court
Elizabeth B. Amato, 1982, senior vice president at United Technologies Corporation
Bessye Anita Warren Bennett, 1973, the first African American woman to practice law in Connecticut
Francisco L. Borges, 1978, former Connecticut State Treasurer and managing partner of Landmark Partners
Leonard C. Boyle, 1983, Deputy Chief State's Attorney (Operations) for the State of Connecticut; Chief, Criminal Division at the U.S. Attorney's Office for the District of Connecticut (1999-2004); Commissioner of the State of Connecticut Department of Public Safety (2004-2007); Director of the FBI's Terrorist Screening Center (2007-2009)
Natalie Braswell, 2007, Connecticut State Comptroller (2021-present); first African American to serve in that office
Vanessa Lynne Bryant, 1978, U.S. District Judge for the United States District Court for the District of Connecticut
Justin Clark, 2004, Deputy Assistant to the President and White House Director of Public Liaison.
Eric D. Coleman, 1977, Deputy President pro tempore in the Connecticut Senate.
Joe Courtney, 1978, U.S. Representative for Connecticut's Second District
Alfred V. Covello, 1960, Senior U.S. District Judge for the United States District Court for the District of Connecticut
Bill Curry, 1977, political analyst and journalist; two-time Democratic nominee for Governor of Connecticut; White House advisor in the administration of Bill Clinton
Emilio Q. Daddario, 1942, U.S. Representative for Connecticut's First Congressional District (1959-1971)
John A. Danaher III, 1980, Judge of the Connecticut Superior Court; Commissioner, Connecticut Department of Public Safety (2007-2010); U.S. Attorney for the District of Connecticut (2001-2002)
Gregory D'Auria, 1988, Associate Justice of the Connecticut Supreme Court (2017–present); Solicitor General and Associate Attorney General of the State of Connecticut (2011-2017)
Robert M. DeCrescenzo, 1988, Shareholder at Updike, Kelly & Spellacy, P.C.; Mayor of East Hartford, Connecticut (1993-1997)
Alexandra Davis DiPentima, 1979, Chief Judge of the Connecticut Appellate Court
Kari A. Dooley, 1988, Judge of the United States District Court for the District of Connecticut
Christopher F. Droney, 1979, U.S. Circuit Judge for the U.S. Court of Appeals for the Second Circuit
Dennis G. Eveleigh, 1972, Associate Justice of the Connecticut Supreme Court
J. Michael Farren, 1982, Deputy White House Counsel to President George W. Bush, convicted of attempted murder
C. Frank Figliuzzi, 1987, assistant director of the Federal Bureau of Investigation Counterintelligence Division (2011-2012)
Robert Giaimo, 1943, U.S. Representative for Connecticut's Third Congressional District (1959-1981)
Mary Glassman, 1986, First Selectman of Simsbury, Connecticut
Bernard F. Grabowski, 1952, U.S. Representative from Connecticut (1963-1967)
Constance Belton Green, 1972, college administrator and first African American alumna
Eunice Groark, 1965, Lieutenant Governor of Connecticut (1991-1995)
F. Herbert Gruendel, 1984, Judge of the Connecticut Appellate Court
Lubbie Harper Jr., 1975, Justice of the Connecticut Supreme Court
Francis X. Hennessy, 1961, Deputy Chief Court Administrator and Judge of the Connecticut Appellate Court
Wesley W. Horton, 1970, appellate attorney who argued Kelo v. New London on behalf of the New London before the U.S. Supreme Court and partner at Horton, Shields & Knox, P.C.
Denise R. Johnson, 1974, First woman appointed to the Vermont Supreme Court
Joette Katz, 1972, Associate Justice of the Connecticut Supreme Court (1992-2011)
Christine E. Keller, 1977, Judge of the Connecticut Appellate Court
Edward Kennedy, Jr., 1997, Member of the Connecticut Senate representing the 12th Senate District; Member at Epstein Becker & Green, P.C.
Robert M. Langer, 1973, head of Wiggin and Dana LLP's Antitrust and Consumer Protection Practice Group
Douglas S. Lavine, 1977, Judge of the Connecticut Appellate Court
Richard Lehr, 1984, veteran journalist, author, and Professor of Journalism at Boston University
Thomas Leonardi , 1954, former Connecticut's Insurance Commissioner and insurance executive
Martin Looney, 1985, Majority Leader, Connecticut Senate
Konstantina Lukes, 1966, Mayor of Worcester, Massachusetts (2007-2010)
Robert J. Lynn, 1975, Chief Justice of the New Hampshire Supreme Court
Joan G. Margolis, 1978, U.S. Magistrate Judge for the United States District Court for the District of Connecticut
Donna F. Martinez, 1978, U.S. Magistrate Judge for the United States District Court for the District of Connecticut
Andrew J. McDonald, 1991, Associate Justice of the Connecticut Supreme Court (2013–present); Member of the Connecticut Senate representing the 27th Senate District (2003-2011)
Thomas Joseph Meskill, 1956, Chief Judge of the U.S. Court of Appeals for the Second Circuit (1992-1993); Governor of Connecticut (1971-1975); U.S. Representative for Connecticut's Sixth Congressional District (1967-1971)
Chris Murphy, 2002, U.S. Senator from Connecticut
Kathleen Murphy, 1987, President, Fidelity Personal Investing, a unit of Fidelity Investments; former chief executive officer of ING U.S. Wealth Management; named to Fortune Magazine's 50 Most Powerful Women in Business List
John Garvan Murtha, 1968, Judge of the United States District Court for the District of Vermont, Chief Judge (1995-2002)
Kevin J. O'Connor, 1992, Associate Attorney General of the United States (2008-2009); U.S. Attorney for District of Connecticut (2002-2006)
Richard N. Palmer, 1977, Associate Justice of the Connecticut Supreme Court
Michele Pearce, 1996, Acting General Counsel of the Department of the Army
Randall Pinkston, 1980, CBS News Correspondent
Lewis Rome, 1957, Connecticut State Senate leader and chair of the UConn Board of Trustees
Ronald A. Sarasin, 1963, U.S. Representative for Connecticut's Fifth Congressional District (1973-1979)
Pedro Segarra, 1985, Mayor of Hartford, Connecticut (2010-2015)
Mickey Sherman, 1971, criminal defense attorney who represented Michael Skakel
William St. Onge, 1948, U.S. Representative for Connecticut's Second Congressional District (1963-1970)
Kevin Sullivan, 1982, Connecticut's 86th Lieutenant Governor, served as Senate President Pro Tempore from 1997 - 2004 in the Connecticut Senate
Christine S. Vertefeuille, 1975, Senior Associate Justice of the Connecticut Supreme Court
Ariane D. Vuono, 1984, Associate Justice of the Massachusetts Appeals Court
Terence S. Ward, 1982, Federal Defender for the District of Connecticut
William A. Webb, 1974, U.S. Magistrate Judge for the U.S. District Court for the Eastern District of North Carolina

Deans of the School of Law 

1921—1933 George Lilliard
1932—1933 Farrell Knapp
1933—1934 Thomas A. Larremore
1934—1942 Edward Graham Biard
1942—1946 Laurence J. Ackerman
1946—1966 Bert Earl Hopkins, J.S.D.
1966—1967 Cornelius J. Scanlon (interim)
1967—1972 Howard R. Sacks 
1972—1974 Francis C. Cady (interim)
1974—1984 Phillip I. Blumberg
1984—1990 George Schatzki
1990—2000 Hugh C. Macgill
2000—2006 Nell Jessup Newton
2006—2007 Kurt A. Strasser (interim)
2007—2012 Jeremy R. Paul
2012—2013 Willajeanne F. McLean (interim)
2013—2020     Timothy Fisher
2020— Eboni Nelson

Gallery

See also
National Register of Historic Places listings in Hartford, Connecticut

References

External links

 

Law schools in Connecticut
Education in Hartford, Connecticut
Law
Educational institutions established in 1921
Buildings and structures in Hartford, Connecticut
Universities and colleges in Hartford County, Connecticut
1921 establishments in Connecticut
National Register of Historic Places in Hartford, Connecticut